Nestsøndre Hellstugutinden is a mountain in Lom Municipality in Innlandet county, Norway. The mountain is surrounded by several other notable mountains including Surtningssue to the east; Reinstinden and Hinnotefjellet to the southeast; Søre Hellstugutinden and Storådalshøe to the south; Semeltinden to the southwest; Urdadalstindene to the northwest; Store Hellstugutinden, Midtre Hellstugutinden, and Nørdre Hellstugutinden to the north; and Store Memurutinden and Austre Memurutinden to the northeast.

Name
The first element is the name of the Hellstugu cabin which was built as a shelter for hunters. The last element is the finite form of tind which means 'mountain peak'. The name of the cabin is a compound of hella which means 'flat stone' or 'flagstone' and stugu which means 'house with one room' or 'cabin'. Most houses in Norway are mostly made of wood, but here they had to use stone because the lack of wood. The first word in the name is nestsøndre which means it is the next peak to the south of the main peak.

See also
List of mountains of Norway by height

References

Jotunheimen
Lom, Norway
Mountains of Innlandet